Shaun de Kock (born 7 May 1985) is a South African cricketer. He played in 74 first-class, 64 List A, and 14 Twenty20 matches for Border from 2004 to 2014.

See also
 List of Border representative cricketers

References

External links
 

1985 births
Living people
South African cricketers
Border cricketers
Warriors cricketers
Cricketers from East London, Eastern Cape